The 1823 New Hampshire gubernatorial election was held on March 11, 1823.

Incumbent Democratic-Republican Governor Samuel Bell did not run for re-election to a fifth term in office.

Levi Woodbury defeated Samuel Dinsmoor with 56.72% of the vote.

Democratic-Republican nomination

Candidates
William Badger, High Sheriff of Strafford County, former President of the New Hampshire Senate
Ezra Bartlett, unsuccessful candidate for U.S. Representative in 1800 and 1804
Josiah Butler, incumbent U.S. Representative
Samuel Dinsmoor, former U.S. Representative
Jonathan Harvey, President of the New Hampshire Senate
Arthur Livermore, former U.S. Representative
David L. Morril, incumbent U.S. Senator
William Pickering, incumbent Treasurer of New Hampshire

Results
The Democratic-Republican caucus met at Concord on June 21, 1822.

The results of the balloting were as follows:

General election

Candidates
Samuel Dinsmoor, former U.S. Representative
Levi Woodbury, Associate Justice of the New Hampshire Superior Court of Judicature

Some 20th Century sources record Woodbury as an Independent Republican. Woodbury stood at the invitation of a convention of Portsmouth Republicans. Contemporary sources record both candidates as Republicans; Dinsmoor as a supporter of William H. Crawford for the U.S. Presidency, and Woodbury a supporter of John Quincy Adams. (However, Woodbury would be elected to the U.S. Senate in 1825 as a Jacksonian)

Results

References

Notes

Bibliography

1823
New Hampshire
Gubernatorial